John "Jack" Tunney Jr. (January 21, 1935 – January 24, 2004) was a Canadian professional wrestling promoter. He was known worldwide for his appearances on World Wrestling Federation television as the promotion's figurehead president. Tunney's tenure was during the company's initial worldwide popularity boom in the 1980s, the peak days of "Hulkamania".

Queensbury Athletic Club/Maple Leaf Wrestling

Early life
In 1930, Jack Corcoran set up Toronto's Queensbury Athletic Club (QAC, later known by the unofficial name of Maple Leaf Wrestling), along with Jack's father, John Tunney Sr., his uncle, Frank Tunney, and Toots Mondt.

Working for his uncle
In 1952, Jack entered into employment with the promotion, first as a referee and later in the booking office working alongside Frank, Norm Kimber, Frank Ayerst, Ed Noonan, and wrestlers Whipper Billy Watson and Pat Flanagan, as they promoted all over southern Ontario. The offices were in Maple Leaf Gardens for many years. In the mid 1970s the office was moved across the street on Carlton St. On March 16, 1956, the first title change to take place in Maple Leaf Gardens happened when Whipper Billy Watson defeated Lou Thesz, ending Thesz's near 7-year reign. Thesz again lost the NWA World Heavyweight Championship again at the Maple Leaf Gardens on November 14, 1957, when he lost the title to Dick Hutton. In 1960, Frank Tunney replaced Sam Muchnick at the NWA's helm, for a year, as president. He also went on to serve as a vice president to Vince McMahon, Sr. in the WW(W)F, as well as having close ties with Japanese promoters. This meant non-stop action in Maple Leaf Gardens approximately every two weeks.

On January 24, 1963, a classic match at Maple Leaf Gardens directly led to the WWWF being formed after Lou Thesz beat World Champion Buddy Rogers and was declared champion. After the event, however, Northeastern promoter Vincent J. McMahon refused to recognize the title change and withdrew his operation from the NWA, becoming the World Wide Wrestling Federation (WWWF, now WWE), with Rogers as the star performer. The WWWF recognized Rogers as its first world champion in April 1963. Through the years, there were never any serious threats to Tunney's position as ruler of pro wrestling in Toronto. Several promoters ran shows at smaller venues in the area, often with Tunney's blessing or indifference. But in the 1970s, there were two notable attempts by other promoters to run big-venue shows in Toronto.

Dave McKigney, a successful promoter outside Toronto and at smaller sites within the city, tried running a show at Varsity Arena in September 1971 with Tony Parisi booked in the main event. Tunney quickly scheduled a Gardens show directly against it. Parisi was a no-show and began working for Tunney the following week. According to the newspapers, the McKigney show drew 700 fans while Tunney got 15,500 at the Gardens. History repeated itself five years later. George Cannon and Milt Avruskin had built strong awareness of their promotion in Toronto through a TV show broadcast on Global TV and taped at the Global studios in Don Mills. They tried to parlay that visibility into running a big-venue show at the CNE Coliseum, but once again Tunney moved quickly to book a Gardens show on the same day. The Toronto Star reported that only 600 people showed up for Cannon's show.

Shared allegiances
In 1977, the Tunneys began looking for a partnership since their major draw (and booker), the Sheik (Edward Farhat) was nearing the end of his popularity as a heel. In 1978, while still utilising some talent from other promotions, including balanced cards for both the AWA and WWF, Frank entered into a partnership with Charlotte, North Carolina-based promoter Jim Crockett, Jr., who ran NWA-affiliated Mid-Atlantic Championship Wrestling in the Carolinas. The arrangement was largely facilitated by George Scott, a key executive with Crockett who had been a preliminary wrestler for Tunney from 1950 to 1956, before becoming a partner in the Toronto promotion. Ric Flair and Ricky Steamboat became the dominant local attractions.

Due to their influence at the time, and despite joining forces with Jim Crockett, Maple Leaf Wrestling did not become a one company promotion. Frank continued to pull off his share of promotional coups and, for the first few years, it wasn't unusual to see two world title matches on the same card during this time, as American Wrestling Association (AWA) and WWWF stars continued to perform in the city. A card with Crockett's talent featured a historic match between WWWF champ Bob Backlund against then AWA champ Nick Bockwinkel. This kind of match was fairly rare with only a few cases of two promotions matching their respective world champs against each other. The show also included a classic Steamboat vs. Flair match for the NWA U.S. Title on the undercard.

In 1978, along with presenting top wrestlers from the U.S., The Tunneys launched the Canadian title and used it to turn Dewey Robertson and Angelo Mosca into local babyface heroes and main event stars. In 1980, the Tunneys presented shows in Buffalo for the first time, working in alignment with the WWF who had the rights to the arena. The first shows proved somewhat successful drawing over 8,000 fans. The Tunneys would continue with sporadic shows in Buffalo over the next couple of years. In the early '80s, rivalries between the various promotions made it difficult to bring talent from different factions together.

Jack takes over
On May 10, 1983, Frank Tunney died, after which Jack and his cousin Eddie Tunney (Frank's son) took control of the promotion. With the years of experience under his belt, Jack moved into the spotlight his uncle loved, as the frontman for the promotion, while Eddie had a low public profile, as his silent partner.

Jack made an immediate impact on his own. The name Maple Leaf Wrestling became the common place name for the Queensbury Athletic Club. He also promoted two large summer outdoor shows at the Exhibition Stadium, dubbed Night Of Champions and Return Of The Champions. The shows would feature 11 title defences and were main evented by NWA Title defenses by Harley Race against Ric Flair.

Aligning with the World Wrestling Federation
When the promotional wars heated up between Crockett and Vince McMahon's World Wrestling Federation, Crockett felt he could no longer spare his top wrestlers for shows in Toronto, sending his B-team as attendance at the Gardens plummeted. Crockett's relationship with the promotion had become strained. He held a distrust of Tunney who persistently utilised talent from other promotions, including the WWF. Furthermore, George Scott, still a partner in the Toronto promotion, had chosen to leave Jim Crockett Promotions due to a pay dispute and was now a booker for the WWF. The Toronto cards got progressively weaker through 1983-84, dwindling down to audiences of 3,000 for some shows. Johnny Weaver was the primary booker for the shows, with Leo Burke and his brothers as the lead heels, along with Don Kernodle, when the top Crockett stars were no longer available.

Jack decided he no longer wanted to promote cards with a mix of WWF, NWA, and other wrestling talent and decided to switch allegiances from the NWA and aligned himself with Vince McMahon's WWF, promoting only WWF cards north of the border. This made Toronto one of the first former NWA strongholds to jump to the WWF, starting a trend that would continue through the 1980s. After a 34-year run, the NWA title—which had made its Gardens debut in October 1949—made its final appearance in the building in May 1984. Whatever nostalgic feelings long-time fans had for the old days, the McMahon-Tunney alliance and Hulkamania captured a whole new audience, attracting sell-out crowds to the Gardens and drawing over 65,000 people to Exhibition Stadium in 1986 and 68,000 to SkyDome for Wrestlemania VI in 1990 to see Hulk Hogan lose the WWF title to the Ultimate Warrior. In June 1984, barely a year since they had taken over the Queensbury Athletic Club from his late uncle Frank, Jack, with Frank's son Eddie, transferred controlling interest of the promotion to the WWF in a maneuver which officially made Toronto a WWF city.

Consequences
The deal between the Tunneys and the WWF was a complex one. The WWF effectively owned Maple Leaf Wrestling and absorbed Jack Tunney into its administration as head of Canadian tours (Due to this, Jack had more power than his cousin Eddie, despite initial plans for Eddie to join Titan sports too). However, the Toronto office remained an independent entity, without which the WWF could not book shows at the Gardens and which received a percentage of every show the company ran in Canada. For Canadian Wrestling promotions, the effect was lasting. The Canadian wrestling scene was struggling at the time, with attendance low. As critics had feared it would, the union between Tunney and McMahon crushed many other wrestling promotions in Canada. Soon, wrestling promotions across Canada fell on hard times as Tunney helped McMahon take over their territories. All-Star Wrestling in Vancouver closed down. The AWA stopped performing in Manitoba. Stu Hart's Stampede promotion began eroding until he too was forced to sell to McMahon (and later starting up again for a few years). Grand Prix, out of Montreal, fought Tunney, but also eventually succumbed. Dave McKigney's Big Time Wrestling couldn't make a go of it due to Tunney's pressuring of Ontario's Boxing & Wrestling Commission to make insurance too expensive for the little guys. New territories, such as Newfoundland were opened up by Lyons and Zarlenga, but could not compete with a WWF machine, consistently setting new attendance records.

For the WWF, moving into the struggling Canadian market, by promoting events at the Maple Leaf Gardens every month, was part of an unheard of and risky national business model, which stretched the company. However, the move made enormous business sense and was instrumental in consolidating WWF's power base in Canada, keeping their competitors out of key Canadian markets, well into the 1990s. With the Gardens locked up by the WWF, the AWA held a show at the CNE Coliseum in December 1989 that drew what remains the smallest crowd ever in the city for a show from major promotion, just 200 people. World Championship Wrestling (WCW), the successor to Crockett, ran three shows at the Coliseum in 1990 with better results, but not good enough to keep Toronto on their schedule. On April 1, 1990, Jack Tunney and Vince McMahon set the stage for WrestleMania VI the very first wrestling event at the brand new Toronto SkyDome. The event set a one-day attendance record for the SkyDome of 67,982. WCW came back in 1993 and drew about 4,000 to SkyDome, and then made a big return to Toronto with two well-attended shows at the Air Canada Centre in 1999 before the promotion fizzled out.

For Maple Leaf Wrestling, critics feared the new partnership would make Toronto just another stop on the WWF circuit. The highest title in the territory, the Canadian Heavyweight Championship (going all the way back to the 30s) was abandoned (although it was resurrected in 1998 and continues to be recognized to this day in the Canadian independent scene). The Maple Leaf Wrestling name continued to be used for the federation's Canadian TV program (a staple of Hamilton station CHCH-TV for many years), of which the WWF took over production after the Tunneys split from the NWA. TV tapings for the show were held in Brantford and other cities in southern Ontario for the next two years, until the WWF ceased the tapings in 1986 and decided to simply use the Maple Leaf Wrestling name for the Canadian airings of WWF Superstars of Wrestling (with some Canadian footage, such as updates by on-air announcer and former wrestler Billy Red Lyons, and special matches taped at Maple Leaf Gardens, added in). There were several sellouts of 18,000 at the Gardens with the WWF crew, but the city's (and, at the time, world's) attendance record was shattered by the show at CNE Stadium on August 28, 1986, which drew 65,000 people, with a gate of over $1 million. At this time, Maple Leaf Wrestling basically ceased to exist. Gone were the days of homegrown talent supplemented by a steady stream of World Champions and stars from all corners of the globe to be replaced by the oncoming Hulkamania.

For the Tunney Family, the move led to a new level of reverence. In March 1987, The WWF held an event called the "Frank Tunney Memorial Tag Team Tournament". (The NWA had held a similar event honoring Jim Crockett Sr.) The WWF credited Tunney with bringing tag team matches to North America. The tournament was won by the  Killer Bees (Jim Brunzell & B. Brian Blair).

For Jack Tunney, this move made him extremely influential and forged his lasting legacy:
 Tunney was made the chief WWF Promoter for Canadian tours (the position later taken by Carl De Marco).
 Tunney was also made the president of Titan Sports Canada, the WWF's Canadian corporate presence, after McMahon began operating under that entity in late 1989.
 Jack Tunney and his cousin Eddie Tunney retained a one-third stake in the Maple Leaf Wrestling promotion, with George Scott holding one-sixth (until 1987).
 Tunney still controlled the booking of Maple Leaf Gardens in Toronto to a large extent, and also covered southern Ontario and Buffalo, New York.
 Due to his new position, Jack, along with his associates Billy Red Lyons and Elio Zarlenga, would usually promote 40 or more WWF shows per year, making him a very important man in the expansion of the WWF, to the status that it enjoys today.

Billy Red Lyons, the longtime wrestling star from Dundas, Ont., who worked as a WWF television commentator at the time of the deal said: ″The timing was perfect, Vince (McMahon) had started to make his move all over the United States. He had big ideas and everybody thought he was just crazy, but not Jack. He saw what kind of an opportunity it was. Thank God the WWF did come in here because the business was dead in Toronto. Local wrestling cards had been drawing just 3,000 a night while the WWF was on the cusp of a popularity explosion when Tunney latched on.″

As the figurehead president (September 1984 – July 12, 1995)
In the summer of 1984 (in part to present Canadian fans with a familiar face as the WWF tried to expand northward) the WWF named Tunney its new figurehead "president" (a similar role to that of current WWE general managers) on the company's television programs, replacing Hisashi Shinma. Tunney filled this role for over a decade (while the '80s "Hulkamania" boom was at its peak). This made Tunney known to fans not only in North America but also worldwide. The title was ceremonial only to provide an authority figure to announce major decisions on television, as Tunney held no backstage power beyond that of a regional promoter; as such, his main roles were that of a storyline authority figure, to make matches, arbitrate disputes between wrestlers and announce major decisions or events on television. Still, he was thrown onto TV whenever a major decision had to be announced and his hard nosed way of doing things earned him the nickname "The Hammerhead". His on-air decisions were portrayed as legitimate in storylines.

As the on-screen President, Tunney "oversaw" many key moments and some of his major television appearances included:

 1986 – Suspending André the Giant from competition after he failed to show for a series of matches. The last being a match in which Andre was supposed to team with Hillbilly Jim against Big John Studd and King Kong Bundy. Bobby "the Brain" Heenan was upset and asked Tunney to suspend him, which he did. Heenan later claimed that Andre was competing as the masked "Giant Machine", and was told by Tunney that if Andre was proven to be one of The Machines, Andre would be suspended for life. (The angle regarding Andre's absence was to give Andre some much needed time off, due to a tour of Japan and to tend to health problems he was starting to experience).
 On "Piper's Pit", reading proclamations and giving trophies to Hulk Hogan and André the Giant (for being WWF Heavyweight Champion for three years and attaining a 15-year undefeated streak, respectively). In one of these he unveiled a new Heavyweight Belt, which was said to be long enough for Andre's waist, as requested by his new manager Bobby Heenan. These appearances were part of an angle foreshadowing Andre's heel turn and set up the main event match at WrestleMania III as Hogan's trophy was reportedly bigger than Andre's.
 January 26, 1987 – Suspending referee Danny Davis "for life plus ten years" after officiating a match where Davis allowed The Hart Foundation to use illegal double-team maneuvers before defeating the British Bulldogs for the WWF Tag Team Championship. He had already officiated a series of controversial matches where he favored the heels for which Tunney had forced an apology from Davis, which included the line "...even though I don't mean it".
 Later in 1987, in response to the kidnapping of The British Bulldogs canine mascot Matilda, indefinitely suspending The Islanders until Matilda was found. The Islanders, as part of an angle, kidnapped Matilda during a match to heat up their feud.
 February 5, 1988, during another Hulk Hogan versus Andre The Giant match. Dave Hebner was supposed to be the referee, but it turned out that Ted DiBiase had paid off Dave's twin brother, Earl, to screw Hogan out of the  Title. At one point, Andre had Hogan pinned and, although Hogan had a shoulder up, a three count was recorded anyway. Dave came to the ring and argued with his brother. Andre ended up handing the belt to DiBiase.
 Several times, Tunney's presence was known even off-camera. One such example was, as part of an angle involving the Andre-Hogan match aired on The Main Event I. As the Superstars of Wrestling program that aired February 6, 1988, was produced prior to the airing of The Main Event (where Andre's title win was booked to take place), a side storyline was contrived to have Tunney place a "gag order" on announcers and commentators from discussing the events surrounding the Andre-Hogan match. Heel color commentator Jesse "the Body" Ventura attempted to bring up the subject several times but was censored each time, upsetting him so much that he left the broadcast booth toward the end of the show.
 Stripping "The Million Dollar Man" Ted DiBiase of the WWF Heavyweight Championship after acquiring the title from new champion André the Giant in exchange for a huge financial payoff. Tunney, who also refused to return the title to Hogan by voiding Andre's controversial pinfall win, declared the championship vacant and announced a 14-man tournament to compete for the held-up championship at WrestleMania IV. The WWF Heavyweight Championship tournament was eventually won by "Macho Man" Randy Savage, who defeated Dibiase in the final round.
 1988 – Tunney was rarely involved in physical confrontations with wrestlers. One exception was when Bad News Brown confronted Tunney on the set of "The Brother Love Show" and demanded a WWF title shot against then-champion Savage. When Brown began implying that Tunney and Savage's manager Miss Elizabeth were involved in an affair (suggesting that Miss Elizabeth was "doing favors" for Tunney to protect Savage from sure defeat), Tunney began scolding Brown for making such a claim, poking his finger in his chest to assert his authority. Brown then grabbed Tunney by his necktie and warned him never to touch him again.
 1989 – Jack Tunney banned "Rugged" Ronnie Garvin from refereeing. Garvin was portraying a referee after losing a retirement match to Greg Valentine, but during matches, he would fight with the wrestlers who would not listen to his orders. Despite warnings by Tunney, Garvin punched Valentine during his match against Jimmy Snuka, which led to him being banned from refereeing.
 1990 – He reversed The Rockers' shock tag title win at an Indiana house show to justify WWF writers ignoring the switch on TV.
 February 10, 1990 – Jack Tunney officially announced the main event of WrestleMania VI. On February 24, Tunney announced  "The Ultimate Challenge" where both the WWF Championship (Hulk Hogan) and Intercontinental Championship (Ultimate Warrior) would be on the line for the first-time ever during the match.
 April 1, 1990 – The peak of Tunney's WWF reign was WrestleMania VI at Toronto's SkyDome. The first WrestleMania held outside of the U.S., the show drew over 67,000. In the main event The Ultimate Warrior (The Intercontinental champion) cleanly pinned Hulk Hogan to win the WWF World Title, and Tunney announced on television there would be no rematch.
 April 15, 1990, on Wrestling Challenge – Jack Tunney announces that the Intercontinental title is vacant since one man cannot defend both titles. Tunney then sets up a tournament for the title.
 1990 – Restricting Demolition to two active members following the 1990 Survivor Series. (This action was announced to explain the departure of Bill Eadie, who performed as the "third" Demolition member Ax, from the WWF).
 Late 1990 – Suspending Rick Rude for making some crude remarks about the Big Bossman's mother for several weeks, culminating in four minutes of "Boss Man's Mama" jokes. Finally, Tunney had had enough and fired him. In reality, the suspension explained Rude's departure from the WWF over a dispute.
 February 1991 – Tunney named Hulk Hogan as the number one contender for the WWF Heavyweight Title. Hogan would defeat Sergeant Slaughter to win the WWF Heavyweight Title for the third time at Wrestlemania VII.
 Fall of 1991 – Distorting the "Real World" title belt of Ric Flair in televised promos when he began performing for the WWF.
 1991 – Tunney became embroiled in a feud between the retired Randy "Macho Man" Savage (As a result of his loss to the Ultimate Warrior at Wrestlemania VII) and Jake "the Snake" Roberts. Jake ruined the wedding party of the Macho Man and Miss Elizabeth after SummerSlam 1991. Macho Man petitioned to be reinstated and the public wanted to see Savage get revenge on Roberts, but Tunney released a statement saying that he was taking the matter "under advisement". Savage nearly got involved in Survivor Series 1991, but in the midst of a scuffle in the ring, Roberts allowed a venomous king cobra to bite the arm of Randy Savage while Savage was restrained in the ropes. Tunney prohibited Jake "The Snake" Roberts from bringing his snake to the ring and officially reinstated Savage in time for a match at the Tuesday in Texas pay-per-view. Savage would defeat Roberts at this event and Tunney escorted Roberts from ringside, following the post-match beatdown of Savage and slapping Miss Elizabeth's face.
 On December 3, 1991 – At Tuesday in Texas, Tunney watched the Hulk Hogan-Undertaker heavyweight title match from ringside to ensure a "fair match" with no outside interference. Toward the end of the match, Ric Flair came down and got into an argument with Tunney who was watching the match from ringside. Hogan grabbed a chair and hit Flair in the back with it. Flair fell into Tunney and they both went down. Hogan used the ashes from the Undertaker's urn to blind the Undertaker and rolled him up to win back the WWF Heavyweight Title. In the aftermath, Tunney stripped Hogan of the title and declared that the championship would be filled by the winner of the 1992 Royal Rumble.
 January 19, 1992 –  At the "Royal Rumble", WWF President Jack Tunney gave Hogan and Undertaker an advantage in the random draw to determine the order in which wrestlers would enter the ring, promising them numbers between 20 and 30. Ric Flair entered at number three and lasted over an hour to become champion. During the show, Bobby Heenan called him "Jack On the take Tunney".
 January 25, 1992 – On the Superstars program following the Royal Rumble, Tunney held a press conference, where he announced that Hogan the No.1 contender, meaning that he would face Flair for the WWF Championship at WrestleMania VIII. Sid Justice, who was also in attendance and began standing up as if Tunney were about to proclaim him the top contender, was outraged and termed the announcement "the most bogus act Jack Tunney has ever pulled off."
 May 1, 1993 – Tunney granted Bret Hart entry into the 1993 King of the Ring tournament without requiring him to win a qualifying match. This was consolation for a result of Hart's controversial loss to Yokozuna at Wrestlemania IX.
 In September 1993 – Jack Tunney announced that he was stripping Shawn Michaels of the WWF Intercontinental Championship for not defending the title often enough. There have been reports that in reality, he had been suspended for testing positive for steroids (a charge he never admitted) and that Michaels refused to drop the belt. Michaels left the WWF for around a month.
 In the buildup to Summerslam 1993 – Tunney ruled that Lex Luger couldn't use his forearm in his match against Yokozuna unless he wore a protective pad. The point of contention was a steel plate inside Luger's arm, which opponents claimed was a weapon used to increase the force of his forearm smash finisher; Tunney said the plate was part of Luger's body. At the event, Luger won by countout when he used his forearm to knock Yokozuna out of the ring, and Yokozuna couldn't answer the 10 count. As a result, Yokozuna retained the WWF Heavyweight Title.
 Summerslam 1993 – Tunney came to the ring and had Howard Finkel announce that Jerry Lawler would be given a lifetime ban if he refused to compete in his scheduled match with Bret Hart. Lawler, however, appeared on crutches (but in his wrestling gear) and claimed that he had been injured in a car accident. He announced that his court jester, Doink the Clown (portrayed by Matt Osborne), would wrestle Hart in his place.
 In the summer of 1994, he forced Lawler to apologize to Duke Droese for "demonstrating such a brutal amount of violence".
 January 22, 1994 – Before the Royal Rumble match began, commentator Vince McMahon announced that WWF President Jack Tunney had shortened the interval between entrances from the traditional two minutes to 90 seconds due to time constraints. One of his final major appearances came in the aftermath of the Royal Rumble — both Bret "the Hitman" Hart and Luger simultaneously eliminated each other, and two debating referees failed to agree on a winner — Tunney declared Bret Hart and Luger co-"winners" of the 1994 Royal Rumble after it could not be determined whose feet hit the floor first. Modifying a stipulation of the Royal Rumble match's outcome, both men would be granted separate matches vs. WWF Heavyweight Champion Yokozuna for the title at WrestleMania X.
 January 23, 1994 – On the WWF Monday Night Raw aired after the Royal Rumble, Tunney declared that a coin toss would determine whether Luger or Hart would get to first wrestle WWF Heavyweight Champion Yokozuna at WrestleMania X for the title. (A championship match at WrestleMania was the prize given to the Royal Rumble match winner.) Luger won the coin toss and the right to face Yokozuna first.
 June 16, 1994 – Made a brief (and increasingly rare) live appearance for the coronation ceremony of the 1994 King of the Ring, Owen Hart. Owen gives Tunney the brush-off so that Neidhart could crown him.

Unlike later authority figures in wrestling, Jack Tunney only appeared on screen when a major decision was needed, which made his announcements seem important. Jack Tunney's on screen character was neutral, rather than the later heel authority figures. However, Tunney's decisions often upset the leading face characters, such as Hulk Hogan. Unlike the WWF's later "Attitude Era", which included storylines of Stone Cold Steve Austin, and others, regularly attacking authority figures, even heel wrestlers rarely got physical with Tunney.

Controversies

In late 1989, Vince McMahon and Titan Sports dropped their partnership with the Tunney family, but hired Jack as the head of Titan Sports Canada. This cut Eddie Tunney, who had been Jack's partner, out of the partnership with the WWF. Eddie Tunney sued Titan and Jack Tunney. Titan  had made the security deposit that reserved the Skydome for WrestleMania VI, and Eddie Tunney had signed the check. Eddie Tunney had also trademarked the "WrestleMania" name in Canada. Titan Sports had to settle the lawsuit with Eddie Tunney in order to run WrestleMania VI.

Tunney supposedly witnessed Terry Garvin sexually harass former WWF referee Mike Clark in the Toronto office and was prepared to back Clark in court. Allegedly, the WWF believed that both Tunney and Clark should toe the company line and let the incident pass for the greater good of the company. According to the Pro Wrestling Observer, towards the end, Tunney believed it was Bret Hart who got him fired (Hart denies this). Tunney didn't think Hart would ever draw money, didn't approve of his main event push and complained publicly about various Hart-related issues. By the time Hart became the top guy, Tunney was unpopular with the faction in the office who got along with Hart. There have long been rumors that Jack Tunney had used company money to pay off gambling debts. This has been rejected by those close to Tunney as an excuse made by the WWF for turning their backs on Jack.

Departure from the WWF
In the 1990s, Tunney's appearances on television and live events grew less frequent. On July 12, 1995, due to financial struggles, McMahon chose to close its Toronto office and run the shows in Toronto without any involvement from Tunney's Toronto office (Billy "Red" Lyons was also gone since he helped Tunney run the office). Tunney was forced out of the WWF, retired and disappeared from the wrestling scene. Following Tunney's departure, Gorilla Monsoon was given the role of on-screen WWF President. Tunney never returned to pro wrestling and this was the end of the Tunney line of Toronto wrestling promoters.

On September 17, 1995, the final WWF show was held at the Gardens and the 64-year affiliation of pro wrestling and Maple Leaf Gardens ended, since Tunney took with him the exclusive rights to wrestling at the Maple Leaf Gardens. Wrestling would return to Toronto on August 24, 1996, with a WWF show held outdoors at Exhibition Stadium drawing 21,211 fans. In 1997 the WWF, still unable to run shows at Maple Leaf Gardens, held a Monday Night Raw taping on January 31, 1997, at the SkyDome. Maple Leaf Gardens closed entirely in 1999, and the WWF returned to regular arena shows at the Air Canada Centre, which opened that fall.

Death
On January 24, 2004, at the age of 69, Tunney died of a heart attack in his sleep at his home in Waterdown, Ontario, after a sudden illness. Frank Zicarelli wrote in the Toronto Sun "He was a very kind and gracious man who did a lot for charities, too".

Tunney's firing from the WWF was never resolved, and upon his death not a single representative from the WWF/E was present at his funeral, nor was his death announced on WWE.com. However, he is still fondly remembered by WWF/E fans for his numerous appearances with the company and the memorable, iconic moments he was involved in during his spell as WWF President.

Posthumous legal battle
After Jack Tunney's death in 2004, there was some discussion of whether North Carolina-based promoter Jim Crockett was ever a partner in the Toronto office.

In Canada, during most of the 1970s and the early 1980s, there was a law called the Foreign Investment Review Act (FIRA) which regulated the foreign ownership of Canadian companies. In November 1980, the Canadian Press reported that the government had approved the creation of a new business called Frank Tunney Sports Promotion, which was co-owned by Frank Tunney Sports Ltd., Jim Crockett Promotions Inc., and 410430 Ontario Ltd., said to be based in Hamilton.

The owner of the numbered corporation wasn't identified (it would be a matter of public record, but you have to pay a service charge to access Ontario corporate records), but Hamilton native George Scott is thought to have been the third partner. He continued to own a part of the office after the affiliation with McMahon and is said to have received a large settlement after he was pushed out of that partnership.

References
General

 

Specific

External links
 Jack Tunney at Cagematch.net
 Gary Will's Toronto Wrestling History: An Annotated Scrapbook
 Gary Will's Toronto Wrestling History: Top drawing matches, year-by-year, 1929–1974
 Smiling John: The forgotten Tunney
 Gary Will's Canadian Pro Wrestling Page of Fame: Frank Tunney
 Ontario Wrestling – A Timeline

1935 births
2004 deaths
Businesspeople from Toronto
Canadian sports businesspeople
Professional wrestling promoters
Sportspeople from Toronto
WWE executives